The first season of Shake It Up aired on Disney Channel from November 7, 2010 to August 21, 2011. The series revolves around two best friends, CeCe Jones (Bella Thorne) and Rocky Blue (Zendaya) as they try to deal with the cons of being on the most famous TV show Shake It Up, Chicago. Throughout the series, they try to keep their head in the game when it comes to school, babysitting, and being on time and prepared to perform on the show. This season filmed from July 2010 to March 2011. The pilot episode was filmed in February 2010.

The first season consisted of 21 episodes. Bella Thorne and Zendaya appear in all of them. Davis Cleveland was absent for two episodes, Adam Irigoyen was absent for three, Roshon Fegan was absent for four and Kenton Duty was absent for nine.

Premise
Two best friends, Rocky Blue (Zendaya) and CeCe Jones (Bella Thorne) become dancing stars on their favorite show Shake It Up, Chicago with the help of Rocky's older brother, Ty (Roshon Fegan) and the girl's closest friend Deuce Martinez (Adam Irigoyen). Besides their career, they have to deal with the disadvantages of being on the show, such as keeping up with school, watching out for CeCe's younger brother, Flynn (Davis Cleveland), and dealing with other issues that involves with the show. They also deal with their competing frenemies, Gunther and Tinka Hessenheffer (Kenton Duty and Caroline Sunshine), who seems to usually annoy Rocky, CeCe, and the rest of the gang, but they sometimes bond with the group on certain occasions. The opening theme "Shake It Up" is performed by Selena Gomez and is included on the debut soundtrack of the series.

Production and release
The series was announced in late 2009 with casting auditions in October 2009. It was originally titled Dance, Dance Chicago, but it was officially announced on May 21, 2010 that the show was going to be called Shake It Up. Bella Thorne and Zendaya were cast as the female leads and Roshon Fegan from Camp Rock as a co-lead. Production of the series started in July 2010 and ended in March 2011. The series officially premiered on November 7, 2010 after the Hannah Montana one-hour special episode and Disney Channel ordered 21 episodes to roll out throughout the first season.

Music

The debut soundtrack "Shake It Up: Break It Down" was released on July 12, 2011 as a 2 Disc CD + DVD combo and was released in European countries as Shake It Up: Dance Dance. "Shake It Up" was released as the first single from the album on February 15, 2011 and "Watch Me" was re-recorded by Bella Thorne and Zendaya in April 2011 and was later released as the second single on June 21, 2011 with an accompanying music video released on June 17, 2011 during the premiere of A.N.T. Farm.

Opening sequence
The opening theme starts with Rocky and CeCe on the front porch doing a dance routine (a clip from the beginning of "Hook It Up"), then showing clips of the cast members that are included in the episodes of the first season, starting off with Zendaya and Bella Thorne, then going in order with Davis Cleveland, Roshon Fegan, Adam Irigoyen, and Kenton Duty. It then shows more various clips of the cast members as it gives credit to the creator of the series, Chris Thompson. A final clip shows Rocky and CeCe doing a small dance routine on the stage of Shake It Up, Chicago with the series title next to them.

Cast

Main
Bella Thorne as CeCe Jones
Zendaya as Rocky Blue
Davis Cleveland as Flynn Jones
Roshon Fegan as Ty Blue
Adam Irigoyen as Deuce Martinez
Kenton Duty as Gunther Hessenheffer

Recurring
Caroline Sunshine as Tinka Hessenheffer

Episodes

References

1
2010 American television seasons
2011 American television seasons